John Lamont Dow (8 December 1837 – 16 July 1923) was an Australian politician.

Born in Kilmarnock, Ayrshire, to weaver David Hill Dow and Agnes Lamont, he arrived in Melbourne in December 1848 and settled in Geelong, becoming a farmer. In 1869 he married Marion Jane Orr, with whom he would have eight children. He later became a journalist and edited the Leader, becoming a vociferous advocate for land reform. In 1877 he was elected to the Victorian Legislative Assembly as the member for Kara Kara, serving until 1893; he was Minister for Agriculture (1886–90) and Mines (1886). In 1893 he was declared insolvent and left politics, returning to journalism. He died at Kew in 1923.

References

1837 births
1923 deaths
Members of the Victorian Legislative Assembly
Scottish emigrants to colonial Australia
People from Kilmarnock
Politicians from Melbourne
Politicians from Geelong
Australian farmers
Australian journalists
Victorian Ministers for Agriculture